Chun Eun-sook (born 6 April 1969) is a South Korean basketball player. She competed in the women's tournament at the 1996 Summer Olympics.

References

1969 births
Living people
South Korean women's basketball players
Olympic basketball players of South Korea
Basketball players at the 1996 Summer Olympics
Sportspeople from Busan
Asian Games medalists in basketball
Asian Games gold medalists for South Korea
Basketball players at the 1990 Asian Games
Basketball players at the 1994 Asian Games
Medalists at the 1990 Asian Games
Medalists at the 1994 Asian Games